Dors is a surname. Notable people with the surname include:

Diana Dors (1931–1984), English film actress and singer
Luciën Dors (born 1984), Dutch footballer

Others
Dors Venabili, a fictional character in Isaac Asimov's Foundation Series

See also
Dor (disambiguation)